Christopher John George (Greek: Χριστόφορος Γεωργίου; February 25, 1931 – November 28, 1983) was an American television and film actor who starred in the 1960s television series The Rat Patrol. He was nominated for a Golden Globe Award in 1967 as Best TV Star for his performance in the series. He was also the recipient of a New York Film Festival award as the Best Actor in a Television Commercial. George was married to actress Lynda Day George.

Early life
Christopher George was born in Royal Oak, Michigan, on February 25, 1931, the son of Greek immigrants John George (Greek: Ιωάννης Γεωργίου) and Vaseleke (Vassiliki) George (Greek: Βασιλική Γεωργίου). John was born in Thebes, Greece, and Vaseleke was born in Athens, Greece.

George did not speak English until he was six years old, because his family only spoke Greek at home. His father was a traveling salesman during his childhood. He accompanied his father on selling trips to cities such as Akron, New York City, Chicago, St. Louis, Memphis, and Detroit.

From Michigan, the family moved to Mountain Lakes, New Jersey. Once he began learning to speak English, his father enrolled him in Greek school in addition to his regular school so that he would not forget the Greek language. That was where George first became interested in acting; at Greek school they performed Greek plays and recited Greek poetry.

When he was 14, he and his family moved to Miami, Florida. As a child, he lived in the Coconut Grove section of Miami and attended Shenandoah Elementary School and Miami Senior High School. In school, he played soccer, football and baseball and ran track. While in Florida, he used to hunt for alligators in the Everglades. After obtaining his driver's license, he worked for his father, driving trucks between Miami and other cities along the Eastern seaboard.

When he was young, George felt bound to become a priest in the Greek Orthodox Church, and his family prepared him for it; his brother Nick said that all through his childhood, Christopher was an altar boy and a choir boy and that his parents and the priest were trying to groom him to become a priest. He served as an altar boy at St. Sophia Greek Orthodox Cathedral in Miami.

Military service
George enlisted in the United States Marine Corps (USMC) on October 13, 1948, at Jacksonville, Florida, at age 17. He lied about his age on his recruitment form by giving his year of birth as 1929, which then stuck with him for most of his adult life. He attributed his enlistment to being inspired by John Wayne, saying, "You know, he caused the enlistment of hundreds of kids in the Marines and I was one of them." According to his military record at the National Personnel Records Center, he attended boot camp at Marine Corps Recruit Depot Parris Island, South Carolina, and graduated with a meritorious promotion to private first class on December 31, 1948.

His first duty station was Headquarters Squadron, Marine Corps Air Station Quantico, Virginia. In April 1950, he transferred to Aircraft Engineering Squadron 12 (AES-12), also located at Quantico. AES-12 maintained the aircraft for school pilots and also used them as a demonstration squadron for members of the United States Congress, demonstrating new rockets and bombs. While assigned to AES-12, he rose to the rank of sergeant. He had forced landings in airplanes while he was in the Marines, and while stationed at Quantico, was very sick, lying in the hospital with "a 110-degree fever."

Both pilots worked to get the engines restarted, dipping to an altitude of about  before they succeeded. Another time, an aircraft caught fire; he had to bail out, in the first parachute jump of his life.

During the Korean War, George skippered a Marine Corps crash boat, and served as gunner aboard the type of rescue aircraft used to fly wounded out of Korea. He completed a three-year enlistment with the Marines and stayed for an additional year, before requesting an honorable discharge and returning home to Miami. He left active service on August 29, 1952.

After that, as a sergeant in the Marine Corps Reserves, he joined Marine Fighter Squadron 142 (VMF-142) of the Marine Air Reserve Training Command, Marine Corps Air Station Miami, Florida. He also served in the 4th Supply Company, in Stockton, California. Finally, he reverted to inactive reserve status and was assigned to Headquarters, 6th MCR&RD (Marine Corps Reserve and Recruiting District), Atlanta, Georgia, until completing his enlisted service and receiving a discharge on September 3, 1956.

While in the Marine Corps, his superior officers encouraged him to apply for flight school and a commission; instead, he chose to receive a discharge so he could return to school. He passed a high school equivalency exam.

During the summer of 1976, he appeared in a recruiting film made for the Marine Corps Air Reserve. On May 5, 2009, the Marine Corps flew a flag over the Iwo Jima Memorial in honor of his service in the Corps.

Military awards 
George earned the Marine Corps Good Conduct Medal and the National Defense Service Medal. These awards are documented in his official military personnel file available at the National Archives and Records Administration.

University education
After completing his enlistment, George attended the University of Miami from 1953 to 1958, where he earned a Bachelor's in Business Administration degree from the school of business. He was a member of Sigma Phi Epsilon, along with his brother Nick, who also attended the University of Miami.

Non-acting jobs
George held down a variety of jobs before he began acting for a living, including working as a private investigator and as a bartender in a Miami bar. He owned and operated eateries and beer bars, one called the Dragnet Drive-In in Miami and another in Stockton, California. The inn in Stockton where he worked for five months during a break from college had been owned by his late uncle for seven years and was off-limits to Marines. He held black belts in karate and judo. He worked as a bouncer in tough restaurants and held a pilot's license.

George was hired by a friend who owned a 110-foot converted Canadian gunboat and transported cargo through the Caribbean for two years. Before graduating from the University of Miami, he had a job lined up with a big investment company; however he instead turned to acting after completing a vocational test battery that indicated that he should work in drama.

Acting career
After graduating from college, George began acting in New York City, where he performed on the stage and in television commercials. His big break came when he was working as a bouncer at a New York waterfront bar and producer Robert Rafelson convinced him to begin an acting career. He studied acting under Wynn Handman and landed roles in Off-Broadway productions of popular plays of the day. Small theater productions in which he appeared while he was studying drama included All My Sons, The Moon Is Blue, Cat on a Hot Tin Roof, Stalag 17 and Who's Afraid of Virginia Woolf? Under drama coach Wynn Handman, he landed a sixteen-week engagement in the play Mr. Roberts with actor Hugh O'Brian; parts in Shakespeare and Tennessee Williams works followed.

His career took off after he made a 60-second TV commercial for shaving cream, where he played the young man in the "Good morning, Mr. Gray" shaving spot, and won the New York Film Festival Award for best actor in a commercial. During this 1962 shaving-cream commercial, George played a groom lathering up before his first honeymoon night, with a line where he said, "It's all for you." The commercial earned him over $30,000. He also appeared in roles on the television series Naked City and Bewitched. While in New York City, George played in the Lemos Greek Repertory Theater because he could speak Greek fluently.

He first appeared on the screen when he landed a role in the film In Harm's Way (1965), playing a dying sailor for 30 seconds. This gave him his first opportunity to meet and work with John Wayne, who had been his boyhood idol and who would become a lifelong friend.  He first rose to prominence playing a supporting role in the Howard Hawks-directed Western film El Dorado (1966) starring both John Wayne and Robert Mitchum in the lead roles. George and Wayne became friends while shooting the film and would co-star in additional Westerns, including Chisum (1970) and The Train Robbers (1973).

The Rat Patrol 
From 1966 to 1968 over the course of two seasons and 58 episodes, George played the lead role of Sergeant Sam Troy on The Rat Patrol. The television series followed the exploits of four Allied soldiers who were part of a long range desert patrol group in the North African campaign during World War II. Along with fellow Rat Patrol members, he appeared in the April 1967 Cherry Blossom Festival and Parade in Washington, D.C.  While starring in The Rat Patrol, Chris also served as an awards presenter at the 1966 Washington, D.C. local version of the Emmy Awards, hosted at the Washington, D.C. Sheraton Park Hotel.

While filming a scene on January 4, 1967, George, as well as fellow cast members Justin Tarr and Gary Raymond, were injured when the Jeep Tarr was driving overturned on a dry lakebed at Rosamond, California as they made a tight turn. George sustained a concussion, tearing something in his neck and injuring his back. Doctors at Cedars-Sinai Medical Center in California were able to determine that his back had been badly sprained, not fractured as they had initially feared.

USO Tour in 1967 

George also joined actor Lawrence P. Casey on a USO tour of Vietnam, Japan and Thailand, which lasted for almost a month and which started on November 12, 1967, and went into December 1967.

During the tour of Vietnam, he visited III Corps Headquarters at Bien Hoa Army Base and used the III Corps signal switchboard to place a telephone call to his girlfriend and future wife, Lynda Day. While in Vietnam, he did not confine himself to the rear echelon, but instead pressed his escorts to allow him to go as far out into the field as they would permit; at one time, they were even pinned down by the Viet Cong.

In November 1967, the USO and the Air Force sent him and several other Hollywood celebrities to visit a military hospital in San Antonio, where military personnel returning from Vietnam with serious burns were being treated. The visit, to Brooke Army Medical Center in San Antonio, was arranged by Johnny Grant, a Hollywood radio personality who had taken troupes of performers to Vietnam; during the visit George and some of the actresses, including his future wife Lynda Day, spent over an hour with a wounded veteran who had been previously uncommunicative and got him to talk.

Post-Rat Patrol 
Following the cancellation of The Rat Patrol, George played the lead role in several genre films of the 1960s, including Tiger by the Tail (1968) co-starring Tippi Hedren; Project X (1968), directed by William Castle; and The Devil's 8 (1969) co-starring Fabian. He narrated a documentary about the careers of Craig Breedlove and Lee Breedlove, a husband-and-wife auto racing team, The Racers: Craig and Lee Breedlove (1968).

In September 1969, he portrayed Ben Richards in the pilot movie for The Immortal which ran on the ABC Movie of the Week. The pilot is based on the science fiction novel The Immortals, by James Gunn. The film was picked up as a television series and ran for 15 episodes from 1970 to 1971. Although the series was cancelled mid-season, episodes were rerun by ABC in the summer of 1971. It was later shown in reruns on the Syfy channel.

During this time, he played Dan August in the television film House on Greenapple Road (1970), which evolved into the television series Dan August starring Burt Reynolds. In addition, he starred in an unsold series pilot, Escape with Avery Schreiber and Huntz Hall, which ABC released in 1971 as a television movie. In it, he portrayed Robin-Hood-like escapologist and nightclub owner Cameron Steele.

He continued his television work throughout the 1970s with guest roles on many popular series, including Owen Marshall: Counselor at Law, Police Story, S.W.A.T., Charlie's Angels, and Fantasy Island. In 1973, he starred opposite of Jim Brown in I Escaped from Devil's Island. He also surprised fans by posing nude for Playgirl magazine in the June 1974 issue. In 1976, he played a supporting role as Lieutenant Commander Wade McClusky in the all-star World War II epic Midway. That same year, he would play the lead role of Ranger Michael Kelly in the Film Ventures International independent film Grizzly. A thinly veiled Jaws clone, the killer animal horror/thriller film became one of the most popular films of George's career, earning more than $39 million at the box office.

He followed that success with a busy string of horror, action, splatter and slasher B movies over the next seven years, including Dixie Dynamite (1976) co-starring Warren Oates; Day of the Animals (1977); City of the Living Dead (1980); Graduation Day (1981); Enter the Ninja (1981); Pieces (1982) and Mortuary (1983).

Recruiting film for the United States Marine Corps Reserve 
In the summer of 1976, prior to returning to MCAS Quantico for a visit, George traveled to Andrews Air Force Base in Maryland to appear in a recruiting video for the US Marine Corps Air Reserves. This video featured Marines assigned to Marine Fighter Attack Squadron 321 just returned from their annual training tour as reservists. The commander of the unit at the time was LtCol Charles McLeran. It was filmed by the J. Walter Thompson advertising company and provided to recruiters in 1978. Archive records show that George was under contract with J. Walter Thompson for this work.

Work with his wife 
George co-starred with his wife Lynda in multiple television films, including Mayday at 40,000 Feet! (1976) and Cruise Into Terror (1978). They also worked together in episodes of The F.B.I. (1970), Mission: Impossible (1971), McCloud (1975), Wonder Woman (1976), Love Boat (1977) and Vega$ (1978). In addition, George and his wife Lynda co-starred in the feature film, Day Of The Animals (1977).

One of his last film roles was a supporting role in the horror film Mortuary. Released in September 1983, it was actually filmed in 1981, more than two years prior to his death.

Personal life

George first met actress Lynda Day in New York where they were doing a fashion layout; prophetically, she was modeling the bride's outfit and he was the groom. They met again later when they starred together in the independent film The Gentle Rain (1966). They would appear in supporting roles together four years later in Chisum starring John Wayne, where they fell in love. On May 15, 1970, they were married in an Episcopal ceremony in a judge's chamber in Palm Beach, Florida. They had two children together — a daughter, Casey and a son, Nicholas.

George's niece is Wheel of Fortune hostess Vanna White. According to White, although George was not a biological relation of hers, her mother grew up with his family and, years later in Los Angeles, he and his wife took her under their wing.

Death
George died of a heart attack at age 52 in the late evening of November 28, 1983, at Westside Hospital in  After dinner at home with his wife, he felt sudden chest pains and was taken by ambulance to the hospital. He later went into cardiac arrest and was pronounced dead at 10:35 p.m., over three hours after he was admitted, while under the care and observation of his cardiologist,  His age at the time of his death was listed as 54, due to an incorrect year of birth (1929), which he listed on his military recruitment form for the U.S. Marines.

Although several sources in the last two decades cite his Rat Patrol injuries as a contributing factor to his death, George was a frequent smoker of cigars, a heavy drinker, had known heart disease and had undergone coronary bypass surgery about five years prior to his death.

A Greek Orthodox mnemósynon (Greek: μνημόσυνον) service was conducted at Westwood Memorial Park and a private funeral was held at Saint Nicholas Greek Orthodox Church in Northridge on Thursday, 

On May 5, 2009, the Marine Corps flew a flag over the Iwo Jima Memorial in honor of his service in the Corps.

Filmography

Film

Television

References

External links

 
 
 Christopher George biography
 The Rat Patrol Classified Dossier
 Review of Grizzly by Scott Weinberg 
 Review of City of the Living Dead by Troy Howarth
 Review of The Day of the Animals by William Simmons
 Independent Star News TV Week article: Christopher George- Rat Patroller Par Excellence by Marian Dern
 Christopher George in Vietnam during USO tour on website for Co A44/36th Signal Bn, 1st Signal Bde Bien Hoa Army Base, Vietnam - 1967/70
 Christopher George photo from Grizzly review article
 A Tribute to Christopher George
 Video of Christopher George in Bewitched as "George the Warlock", aired 22 April 1965 
 Video of Christopher George in The Love Boat as Bill Wainwright, 13 May 1978 (Season 1, Episode 24) 
 Video of Christopher George in Charlie's Angels episode "Terror on Skis" season 3, episode 16 
 After the location shooting for the film "Enter the Ninja" Christopher George shops with colleagues and Amapola in Manila, the Philippines
 Aircraft Engineering Squadron-12 (AES-12) website
 

1931 births
1983 deaths
American male film actors
American male television actors
American people of Greek descent
Male actors from Michigan
People from Royal Oak, Michigan
Playgirl Men of the Month
United States Marines
20th-century American male actors
Burials at Westwood Village Memorial Park Cemetery
People from Mountain Lakes, New Jersey
Male actors from Miami
Miami Senior High School alumni
United States Marine Corps personnel of the Korean War
United States Marine Corps reservists